Parliamentary elections were held in Austria on 25 November 1945, the first after World War II. The elections were held according to the Austrian election law of 1929, with all citizens at least 21 years old eligible to vote, however former Nazis were banned from voting, official sources putting their numbers at around 200,000.

The Austrian People's Party, comprising elements of the prewar Christian Social Party under the leadership of Leopold Figl, won a decisive victory, receiving just under half of the vote and 85 of the 165 seats in the National Council. With an outright majority of two seats, the ÖVP could have governed alone. However, Figl retained the three-party grand coalition alongside the Socialists and Communists. The Communists, who had been equally represented in the government of Figl's predecessor, Socialist Karl Renner, since the end of the war, only received one cabinet post.

On 20 December 1945 the Federal Assembly unanimously elected incumbent Chancellor Renner as President. Renner swore in Figl as new chancellor on the same day.

The Communists won only four seats, which some blamed on the conduct of the Red Army in the Soviet occupied zone of Austria. This proved to be the beginning of a long decline for the Communists, though they stayed in the chamber until May 1959.

Results

References

Elections in Austria
Austria
Parliament
Austrian Parliament
Austria